Tinea pallescentella, the large pale clothes moth, is a moth of the  family Tineidae. It is found in most of Europe (except the Iberian Peninsula and most of the Balkan Peninsula). It is also present in western North America, where it has been recorded from California. There are also records from South America (including Argentina) and Australia.

The head is light greyish ochreous, fuscous-mixed. Forewings are light greyish-ochreous mixed with fuscous ; base of costa and a short basal subdorsal dash dark fuscous ; stigmata dark fuscous, elongate, plical forming a more or less extended dash along fold ; two indistinct whitish dots beyond second discal ; some cloudy dark fuscous terminal spots. Hindwings very pale grey. Adults are on wing year round.

The larvae feed on keratinous animal matter such as hair, wool, fur or feathers.

References

Gaedike,R. 2019  Tineidae II : Myrmecozelinae, Perissomasticinae, Tineinae, Hieroxestinae, Teichobiinae and Stathmopolitinae Microlepidoptera of Europe, vol. 9. Leiden : Brill, [2019] 
Petersen, G., 1957: Die Genitalien der paläarktischen Tineiden (Lepidoptera: Tineidae). Beiträge zur Entomologie 7 (1/2): 55–176.

External links
Lepiforum de

Moths described in 1851
Tineinae